Amaechi Dominic Igwe (born May 20, 1988) is an American retired professional soccer player who played as a defender.

Career

College
Born in Belmont, California, Igwe played college soccer at Santa Clara University before signing a generation Adidas contract with Major League Soccer.

Professional
Igwe was drafted in the first round, 12th overall in the 2007 MLS SuperDraft by New England Revolution.  On May 21, 2010, he signed with German club FC Ingolstadt 04. Igwe suffered an injury during a preseason match and was sidelined for the entire 2010-11 season. Igwe and FC Ingolstadt came to an agreement and he left the club with a year left on his contract to spend the 2011–12 season with SV Babelsberg 03.

International
Igwe was a member of the U.S. Soccer residency program in Bradenton Florida from 2004-05. He represented the U17 Youth National Team in the World Championships in Peru.  He also represented the U20 Men's National Team in Canada after being named to the US squad for the 2007 FIFA U-20 World Cup.

References

External links
 
 Revolution player profile

1988 births
Living people
Soccer players from San Jose, California
American soccer players
American expatriate soccer players
Santa Clara Broncos men's soccer players
New England Revolution players
FC Ingolstadt 04 players
SV Babelsberg 03 players
Major League Soccer players
3. Liga players
American expatriate soccer players in Germany
United States men's youth international soccer players
United States men's under-20 international soccer players
New England Revolution draft picks
Association football defenders
People from Belmont, California